The 2009 World Senior Curling Championships were held from April 24 to May 3 at the Dunedin Curling Club in Dunedin, New Zealand.

Men

Teams

Group A

Group B

Round-robin standings

Results

Group A

Draw 1

Draw 2

Draw 3

Draw 4

Draw 5

Group B

Draw 1

Draw 2

Draw 3

Draw 4

Draw 5

Playoffs

Semifinals

Bronze-medal game

Final

Women

Teams

Round-robin standings

Results

Draw 1

Draw 2

Draw 3

Draw 4

Draw 5

Draw 6

Draw 7

Playoffs

Semifinals

Bronze-medal game

Final

References

External links
Women's results
Men's results

World Senior Curling Championships
2009 in curling
2009 in New Zealand sport
International curling competitions hosted by New Zealand
Sports competitions in Dunedin
2000s in Dunedin